Oldenburg – Ammerland is an electoral constituency (German: Wahlkreis) represented in the Bundestag. It elects one member via first-past-the-post voting. Under the current constituency numbering system, it is designated as constituency 27. It is located in northwestern Lower Saxony, comprising the city of Oldenburg and the district of Ammerland.

Oldenburg – Ammerland was created for the inaugural 1949 federal election. Since 2013, it has been represented by Dennis Rohde of the Social Democratic Party (SPD).

Geography
Oldenburg – Ammerland is located in northwestern Lower Saxony. As of the 2021 federal election, it comprises the independent city of Oldenburg and the entirety of the district of Ammerland.

History
Oldenburg – Ammerland was created in 1949. In the 1949 election, it was Lower Saxony constituency 8. For the 1953 through 1961 elections, it was constituency 30 in the numbering system. From 1965 through 1998, it was constituency 22; from 2002 through 2009, it was constituency 28. Since the 2013 election, it has been constituency 27.

Originally, it comprised the city of Oldenburg and the district of Ammerland. At this time, it was named Oldenburg. In the 1965 election, the constituency gained the municipalities of Bockhorn, Neuenburg, Sande, Varel, Varel-Land, and Zetel. Due to administrative reforms, in the 1976 election, it gained the municipality of Gödens.

In the 1980 election, the constituency was renamed to Oldenburg – Ammerland, and lost the municipality of Sande. The municipalities of Bockhorn, Varel, and Zetel also removed from the constituency in the 2002 election.

Members
The constituency was held by the Free Democratic Party (FDP) from its creation in 1949 until 1957, during which time it was represented by Robert Dannemann. It was won by the Christian Democratic Union (CDU) in 1957, and represented by Wilhelm Nieberg (until 1965) and Heinz Frieler. In 1969, it was won by the Social Democratic Party (SPD) candidate Kurt Ross, who served for one term. He was succeeded in 1972 by Walter Polkehn, who served until 1987. Dietmar Schütz was representative from then until 2002, followed by Gesine Multhaupt. Thomas Kossendey of the CDU served a single term from 2009 to 2013. Dennis Rohde of the SPD was elected in 2013, and re-elected in 2017 and 2021.

Election results

2021 election

2017 election

2013 election

2009 election

References

Federal electoral districts in Lower Saxony
1949 establishments in West Germany
Constituencies established in 1949